Mehr-e Olya (also Romanized as Mehr-e ‘Olyā; also known as Mast-e Bālā, Mast-e ‘Olyā, and Mast-ī-Bāla) is a village in Enaj Rural District, Qareh Chay District, Khondab County, Markazi Province, Iran. At the 2006 census, its population was 1,449, in 371 families.

References 

Populated places in Khondab County